Alexander Refsum Jensenius (born 10 November 1978) is a Norwegian researcher and musician. He is Professor of music technology and was Head of the Department of Musicology, University of Oslo during the period 2013-2016. He is currently Deputy Director of RITMO - Centre for Interdisciplinary Studies in Rhythm, Time and Motion at the University of Oslo, and serves as the Chair of the Steering Committee for NIME, the International Conference in New Interfaces for Musical Expression. He is the grandson of politician Marie Borge Refsum.

Jensenius is educated in music, computer science, physics and mathematics. He was awarded a Master of Arts degree (cand.philol.) in Music technology by the University of Oslo in 2002, and was awarded a doctorate by the same institution in 2008. In addition he holds a Master of Science degree in applied information technology from Chalmers University of Technology in Gothenburg. He has been guest researcher at University of California, Berkeley and McGill University in Montreal.

Jensenius received an unusually high degree of media attention when he finished his doctorate. Several newspapers and TV stations named him "Dr Air guitar". This was based on his research into musical gestures. He had developed new technology for analysis of movement. This technology is both used in music research and in psychological research on ADHD.

Alexander Jensenius was president of the Norwegian Association of Young Scientists from 1999 to 2001, and has also been project manager for European Space Camp at Andøya Rocket Range. He was a candidate for the board of the University of Oslo in 2007.

Bibliography

References

External links 
Alexander Refsum Jensenius' blog

Research by Alexander Refsum Jensenius (UiO – Frida)

University of Oslo alumni
Musicians from Asker
1978 births
Living people
20th-century Norwegian scientists
21st-century Norwegian scientists
20th-century Norwegian musicians
21st-century Norwegian musicians
20th-century Norwegian educators
21st-century Norwegian educators